In mathematics and computer science, a primality certificate or primality proof is a succinct, formal proof that a number is prime. Primality certificates allow the primality of a number to be rapidly checked without having to run an expensive or unreliable primality test. "Succinct" usually means that the proof should be at most polynomially larger than the number of digits in the number itself (for example, if the number has b bits, the proof might contain roughly b2 bits).

Primality certificates lead directly to proofs that problems such as primality testing and the complement of integer factorization lie in NP, the class of problems verifiable in polynomial time given a solution. These problems already trivially lie in co-NP. This was the first strong evidence that these problems are not NP-complete, since if they were, it would imply that NP is subset of co-NP, a result widely believed to be false; in fact, this was the first demonstration of a problem in NP intersect co-NP not known, at the time, to be in P.

Producing certificates for the complement problem, to establish that a number is composite, is straightforward: it suffices to give a nontrivial divisor. Standard probabilistic primality tests such as the Baillie–PSW primality test, the Fermat primality test, and the Miller–Rabin primality test also produce compositeness certificates in the event where the input is composite, but do not produce certificates for prime inputs.

Pratt certificates 

The concept of primality certificates was historically introduced by the Pratt certificate, conceived in 1975 by Vaughan Pratt, who described its structure and proved it to have polynomial size and to be verifiable in polynomial time. It is based on the Lucas primality test, which is essentially the converse of Fermat's little theorem with an added condition to make it true:
 Lucas' theorem: Suppose we have an integer a such that:
 an − 1 ≡ 1 (mod n),
 for every prime factor q of n − 1, it is not the case that a(n − 1)/q ≡ 1 (mod n).
 Then n is prime.

Given such an a (called a witness) and the prime factorization of n − 1, it's simple to verify the above conditions quickly: we only need to do a linear number of modular exponentiations, since every integer has fewer prime factors than bits, and each of these can be done by exponentiation by squaring in O(log n) multiplications (see big-O notation). Even with grade-school integer multiplication, this is only O((log n)4) time; using the multiplication algorithm with best-known asymptotic running time, the Schönhage–Strassen algorithm, we can lower this to O((log n)3(log log n)(log log log n)) time, or using soft-O notation Õ((log n)3).

However, it is possible to trick a verifier into accepting a composite number by giving it a "prime factorization" of n − 1 that includes composite numbers. For example, suppose we claim that n = 85 is prime, supplying a = 4 and n − 1 = 6 × 14 as the "prime factorization". Then (using q = 6 and q = 14):
 4 is coprime to 85,
 485−1 ≡ 1 (mod 85),
 4(85−1)/6 ≡ 16 (mod 85), 4(85−1)/14 ≡ 16 (mod 85).

We would falsely conclude that 85 is prime. We don't want to just force the verifier to factor the number, so a better way to avoid this issue is to give primality certificates for each of the prime factors of n − 1 as well, which are just smaller instances of the original problem. We continue recursively in this manner until we reach a number known to be prime, such as 2. We end up with a tree of prime numbers, each associated with a witness a. For example, here is a complete Pratt certificate for the number 229:
 229 (a = 6, 229 − 1 = 22 × 3 × 19),
 2 (known prime),
 3 (a = 2, 3 − 1 = 2),
 2 (known prime),
 19 (a = 2, 19 − 1 = 2 × 32),
 2 (known prime),
 3 (a = 2, 3 − 1 = 2),
 2 (known prime).

This proof tree can be shown to contain at most  values other than 2 by a simple inductive proof (based on theorem 2 of Pratt). The result holds for 3; in general, take p > 3 and let its children in the tree be p1, ..., pk. By the inductive hypothesis, the tree rooted at pi contains at most  values, so the entire tree contains at most

 

since k ≥ 2, and p1...pk = p − 1. Since each value has at most log n bits, this also demonstrates that the certificate has a size of O((log n)2) bits.

Since there are O(log n) values other than 2, and each requires at most one exponentiation to verify (and exponentiations dominate the running time), the total time is O((log n)3(log log n)(log log log n)), or Õ((log n)3), which is quite feasible for numbers in the range that computational number theorists usually work with.

However, while useful in theory and easy to verify, actually generating a Pratt certificate for n requires factoring n − 1 and other potentially large numbers. This is simple for some special numbers such as Fermat primes, but currently much more difficult than simple primality testing for large primes of general form.

Atkin–Goldwasser–Kilian–Morain certificates 
To address the problem of efficient certificate generation for larger numbers, in 1986 Shafi Goldwasser and Joe Kilian described a new type of certificate based on the theory of elliptic curves. This was in turn used by A. O. L. Atkin and François Morain as the basis for Atkin-Goldwasser-Kilian-Morain certificates, which are the type of certificates generated and verified by elliptic curve primality proving systems. Just as Pratt certificates are based on Lucas's theorem, Atkin–Goldwasser–Kilian–Morain certificates are based on the following theorem of Goldwasser and Kilian (lemma 2 of "Almost All Primes Can Be Quickly Certified"):
 Theorem: Suppose we are given:
 a positive integer n not divisible by 2 or 3;
 a prime .
 Then M = (Mx, My) is a non-identity point on the elliptic curve y2 = x3 + Ax + B. Let kM be M added to itself k times using standard elliptic-curve addition. Then, if qM is the identity element I, then n is prime.

However, it can be shown (lemma 1 of "Almost All Primes Can Be Quickly Certified") that if we merely perform computations as though the curve were well-defined and do not at any point attempt to invert an element with no inverse, the result is still valid; if we do encounter an element with no inverse, this establishes that n is composite.

To derive a certificate from this theorem, we first encode Mx, My, A, B, and q, then recursively encode the proof of primality for q < n, continuing until we reach a known prime. This certificate has size O((log n)2) and can be verified in O((log n)4) time. Moreover, the algorithm that generates these certificates can be shown to be expected polynomial time for all but a small fraction of primes, and this fraction exponentially decreases with the size of the primes. Consequently, it's well-suited to generating certified large random primes, an application that is important in cryptography applications such as generating provably valid RSA keys.

Pocklington Based Certificates 

Provable prime generation based on variants of Pocklington's theorem (see Pocklington primality test) can be efficient techniques for generating primes (cost is generally less than probabilistic generation) with the added benefit of built in primality certificates. While these may seem to be special primes, notice that every prime integer could be generated with a Pocklington based provable generation algorithm.

Pocklington Primality Tests 

Let  where  where  are distinct primes with  an integer greater than zero and a witness  such that:

Then P is prime if one of the following holds:

Pocklington Primality Certificate

A Pocklington primality certificate consists of the prime P, a set primes  dividing , each with their own Pocklington prime certificate or small enough to be a known prime, and a witness .

A Small Example

Let .
 For version , the certificate needs only .
 for version , the certificate needs only , but there's a bit more work to do:
 
  and 
 Using  fails: 

Impact of "PRIMES is in P" 

"PRIMES is in P" was a breakthrough in theoretical computer science. This article, published by Manindra Agrawal, Nitin Saxena, and Neeraj Kayal in August 2002, proves that the famous problem of checking primality of a number can be solved deterministically in polynomial time.  The authors received the 2006 Gödel Prize and 2006 Fulkerson Prize for this work.

Because primality testing can now be done deterministically in polynomial time using the AKS primality test, a prime number could itself be considered a certificate of its own primality. This test runs in Õ((log n)6) time. In practice this method of verification is more expensive than the verification of Pratt certificates, but does not require any computation to determine the certificate itself.

References

External links 
 Mathworld: Primality Certificate
 Mathworld: Pratt Certificate
 Mathworld: Atkin-Goldwasser-Kilian-Morain Certificate
 The Prime Glossary: Certificate of Primality
 Vašek Chvátal. Lecture notes on Pratt's Primality Proofs. Department of Computer Science. Rutgers University. PDF version at Concordia University.
 Wim van Dam. Proof of Pratt's Theorem. (Lecture notes, PDF)

Primality tests